Santa Monica Studio is an American video game developer based in Los Angeles. A first-party studio for Sony Interactive Entertainment, it is best known for developing the God of War series. The studio was founded in 1999 by Allan Becker and was located in Santa Monica, California, until relocating to Playa Vista in 2014.

History 
Santa Monica Studio was founded in 1999 by Allan Becker, a long-time Sony employee who wanted "to break out of the corporate Foster City group" of Sony Computer Entertainment. The studio was established in an office next to the developer Naughty Dog before moving into a brick building in the suburbs of Santa Monica, California. The building at Penn Station would be occupied for fifteen years. For its first game, the racing title Kinetica, Santa Monica Studio decided to skip the PlayStation console and built the game for the console's then-upcoming successor, the PlayStation 2, instead. A game engine was developed "to give the [PlayStation 2] some legs" for Kinetica and future releases. While the game was developed during the studio's team building phase, producer Shannon Studstill focused on the game's release to prove to Sony that Santa Monica Studio was capable of delivering a product on schedule and within budget. Kinetica was released on time in 2001, with the studio staying under the allocated budget. After publication, Santa Monica Studio shifted to its next project, God of War, while re-using the engine from Kinetica.

The External Development group, a department within Santa Monica Studio separate from internal development teams, acts as both a video game publisher and business incubator for indie game studios, notably Thatgamecompany and its game Journey. Other incubated teams include Broodworks, Eat Sleep Play, Fun Bits, Giant Sparrow, Incognito Entertainment, Q-Games, and Ready at Dawn. Becker left Santa Monica Studio in 2011. By March 2012, Becker had joined Sony's Japan Studio, while Shannon became Santa Monica Studio's "Senior Director of Product Development". In January 2014, Santa Monica Studio announced that it would move from their Penn Station offices to The Reserve, a 20-acre facility on Jefferson Boulevard in Playa Vista, Los Angeles. The  of office space were "four or five times the size" of their previous Santa Monica office, according to Studstill. At the time, the studio employed roughly 240 people. An undisclosed numbers of staffers were laid off in February that year due to the cancelation of a new intellectual property, including Stig Asmussen, who headed the canceled project. The studio relocation was completed on July 22, 2014, coupled with a new logo, dubbed SMS "Vanguard".

In March 2020, Studstill left Santa Monica Studio to lead a new development studio under Stadia. Subsequently, a long-time employee and previous director of product development for Santa Monica Studio, Yumi Yang, was installed as the developer's studio head.

Games developed

External Development games

References

External links 
 

1999 establishments in California
American companies established in 1999
Companies based in Los Angeles
Companies based in Santa Monica, California
First-party video game developers
PlayStation Studios
Video game companies based in California
Video game companies established in 1999
Video game development companies